Phyllonorycter engelhardiae is a moth of the family Gracillariidae. It is known from the Nepal.

The wingspan is about 6 mm.

The larvae feed on Engelhardia spicata. They mine the leaves of their host plant. The mine has the form of a rather small blotch occurring upon the upper side of the leaves, usually situated along the leaf-margin or on the space between two lateral veins. It is oval or circular in form. The upper epidermis of the leaf on the mining part is whitish, blistered or weakly wrinkled and without any distinct ridges in accomplished condition.

References

engelhardiae
Moths of Asia

Lepidoptera of Nepal
Leaf miners
Taxa named by Tosio Kumata
Moths described in 1973